Elke Philipp (born 4 February, 1964) is a German Paralympic equestrian.

Philipp has had cerebellar ataxia since 1984 when she suffered from a swelling of the brain due to Viral meningitis.  This resulted in her staying in hospital for 18 months, the paralysis of the left side of her brain and having to have a permanent tracheotomy.

She won a silver medal at the 2016 Paralympics in the team event alongside Alina Rosenberg, Carolin Schnarre and Steffen Zeibig.
She also a bronze medal at the 2014 FEI World Equestrian Games in individual freestyle event and two bronze medals at the 2018 FEI World Equestrian Games in the individual championship and team para-dressage events.

She has also competed in para-skiing events and works as a senior laboratory assistant.

References

External links
 
 
 

1964 births
Living people
German dressage riders
German female equestrians
Paralympic equestrians of Germany
Paralympic silver medalists for Germany
Paralympic medalists in equestrian
Equestrians at the 2016 Summer Paralympics
Medalists at the 2016 Summer Paralympics
People from Treuchtlingen
Sportspeople from Middle Franconia
20th-century German women
21st-century German women